Stathis Tsanaktsis (27 February 1934 – 1 February 2002) was a Greek footballer. He played in four matches for the Greece national football team from 1957 to 1962.

References

External links
 

1934 births
2002 deaths
Greek footballers
Greece international footballers
Place of birth missing
Association footballers not categorized by position
Footballers from Ioannina